Woman on the Beach is the seventh feature film by South Korean director Hong Sang-soo, and was released in 2006.

Plot
Film director and screenwriter Kim Jung-rae asks his friend Won Chang-wook to drive with him from their homes in Seoul to the resort town of Shinduri, on the western coast of South Korea. Chang-wook initially resists, but accepts the request on the condition that he can bring Kim Mun-suk, a composer and aspiring singer whom he describes as being his girlfriend. Jung-rae is writing a treatment for a film titled "About Miracles," concerning the mysterious connections that secure everyday life—themes that play a major role in the work of Hong Sang-Soo.

During the journey, Mun-suk quickly makes clear that she does not consider herself Chang-wook's girlfriend, and she finds herself and Jung-rae increasing drawn together. As the three drive on, Mun-suk discusses her years living abroad in Germany and reveals that she has had a number of relationships with Europeans, a fact that greatly disturbs both Chang-wook and Jung-rae. Mun-suk is particularly disappointed in Jung-rae's reaction, claiming, "You're not like your films."  Nevertheless, Mun-suk and Jung-rae later kiss on the beach and then sleep together in a low-rent hotel room. The next day, as the three drive back to Seoul, Jung-rae pulls back from his intimacy with Mun-suk.

He returns to the beach alone two days later. Missing Mun-suk despite his actions, Jung-rae hits on two women, one of whom vaguely resembles Mun-suk, by introducing himself as a film director and asking to interview them for his screenplay. Jung-rae proceeds to seduce Choi Sun-hee in much the same fashion as he had Mun-suk just a few days prior. While sleeping with one of the women, Sun-hee, in the same beachside motel where he'd been with Mun-suk, Jung-rae is surprised to find that Mun-suk has returned to Shinduri, found his room, and started banging on the door loudly and very late at night. Jung-rae sneaks Sun-hee out of his room through a separate exit.

The next morning as Mun-suk sleeps at the foot of his door with a terrible hangover. Jung-rae attempts to reconcile with Mun-suk and lies about his night with Sun-hee, although his lie is increasingly transparent to all concerned. Having alienated Mun-suk and left Sun-hee without a goodbye, Jung-rae returns to Seoul with a creative breakthrough on his screenplay.

Cast
 Kim Seung-woo ... Director Kim Jung-rae
 Go Hyun-jung ... Kim Mun-suk
 Song Seon-mi ... Choi Sun-hee
 Kim Tae-woo ... Won Chang-wook
 Moon Sung-keun ... (voice)
 Jung Chan ... Guy driving Mun-suk home
 Lee Ki-woo ... Beach resort caretaker
 Oh Tae-kyung ... Waiter at empty sushi restaurant
 Choi Ban-ya ... Sun-hee's friend

Release
Woman on the Beach was released in South Korea on August 31, 2006, and received a total of 225,388 admissions nationwide.

Reception
Woman on the Beach has an 87% approval rating on Rotten Tomatoes, and a 72/100 average on Metacritic.

Awards and nominations
2006 Busan Film Critics Awards
 Best Supporting Actor - Kim Tae-woo
 Best New Actress - Go Hyun-jung

2006 Korean Film Awards
 Nomination - Best Actress - Go Hyun-jung
 Nomination - Best Director - Hong Sang-soo
 Nomination - Best Cinematography - Kim Hyung-koo
 Nomination - Best New Actress - Go Hyun-jung

2006 Director's Cut Awards
 Best Director - Hong Sang-soo

2007 Asian Film Awards
 Nomination - Best Director - Hong Sang-soo
 Nomination - Best Screenplay - Hong Sang-soo
 Nomination - Best Music - Jeong Yong-jin

2007 Baeksang Arts Awards
 Nomination - Best New Actress - Go Hyun-jung

2007 Grand Bell Awards
 Nomination - Best New Actress - Go Hyun-jung

References

External links
 Woman on the Beach on Filmbom.com 
 
 
 
 

2006 films
2006 romantic comedy films
South Korean romantic comedy films
South Korean independent films
Films directed by Hong Sang-soo
2000s Korean-language films
2006 independent films
2000s South Korean films